The 1982 Toronto Blue Jays season was the franchise's sixth season of Major League Baseball. It resulted in the Blue Jays finishing sixth in the American League East (tied with Cleveland) with a record of 78 wins and 84 losses, 17 games behind the American League Champion Milwaukee Brewers. Bobby Cox became the third field manager in team history.

Dave Stieb established himself as one of the top pitchers in the American League, as he led the AL with 19 complete games and 5 shutouts.

Offseason
 November 17, 1981: Aurelio Rodríguez was traded by the New York Yankees to the Toronto Blue Jays for a player to be named later. The Toronto Blue Jays sent Mike Lebo (minors) (December 9, 1981) to the New York Yankees to complete the trade.
 November 27, 1981: Danny Ainge was released by the Blue Jays.
 December 28, 1981: Paul Mirabella was traded by the Blue Jays to the Chicago Cubs for a player to be named later. The Cubs completed the deal by sending Dave Geisel to the Blue Jays on March 25.
 March 25, 1982: Phil Huffman was traded by the Blue Jays to the Kansas City Royals for Rance Mulliniks.

Regular season
One of the key events of the season was that the Toronto Blue Jays sold its first beer. Exhibition Stadium was the only stadium in the major leagues that did not sell beer. The Ontario Legislature reached a decision on July 7, 1982. Dr. Robert Elgie, the minister of Consumer and Commercial Relations announced that beer would be sold on a trial basis at Exhibition Stadium (along with Hamilton's Ivor Wynne Stadium and Ottawa's Lansdowne Park). On July 30, 1982, Paul Godfrey sold the first ceremonial beer at Exhibition Stadium to William Turner, a fan from London, Ontario.

Opening Day lineup
 Jesse Barfield
 Mark Bomback
 Dámaso García
 Alfredo Griffin
 John Mayberry
 Lloyd Moseby
 Rance Mulliniks
 Willie Upshaw
 Ernie Whitt
 Al Woods

Season standings

Record vs. opponents

Notable transactions
 April 2, 1982: Aurelio Rodríguez was traded by the Blue Jays to the Chicago White Sox for Wayne Nordhagen.
 May 5, 1982: John Mayberry was traded by the Blue Jays to the New York Yankees for Dave Revering, Tom Dodd, and Jeff Reynolds (minors).
 June 7, 1982: 1982 Major League Baseball draft
Jimmy Key was drafted by the Blue Jays in the 3rd round. Player signed June 12, 1982.
Mike Henneman was drafted by the Blue Jays in the 27th round, but did not sign.
 June 15, 1982: Wayne Nordhagen was traded by the Blue Jays to the Philadelphia Phillies for Dick Davis.
 June 22, 1982: Dick Davis was traded by the Blue Jays to the Pittsburgh Pirates for a player to be named later. The Pirates completed the deal by sending Wayne Nordhagen to the Blue Jays on June 25.

Roster

Game log

|-  style="text-align:center; background:#bbb;"
| -- || April 6 || @ Tigers || colspan=6|Postponed (snow) Rescheduled for April 7
|-  style="text-align:center; background:#bbb;"
| -- || April 7 || @ Tigers || colspan=6|Postponed (snow) Rescheduled for April 15
|-  style="text-align:center; background:#bbb;"
| -- || April 8 || @ Tigers || colspan=6|Postponed (snow) Rescheduled for August 5
|-  style="text-align:center; background:#fbb;"
| 1 || April 9 || Brewers || 15 – 4 || Vuckovich (1-0) || Bomback (0-1) || || 30,216 || 0-1
|-  style="text-align:center; background:#bfb;"
| 2 || April 10 || Brewers || 3 – 2 (10) || Jackson (1-0) || Fingers (0-1) || || 11,141 || 1-1
|-  style="text-align:center; background:#fbb;"
| 3 || April 11 || Brewers || 14 – 5 || McClure (1-0) || Clancy (0-1) || || 10,128 || 1-2
|-  style="text-align:center; background:#bfb;"
| 4 || April 12 || Tigers || 9 – 5 || Leal (1-0) || Wilcox (0-1) || || 11,180 || 2-2
|-  style="text-align:center; background:#fbb;"
| 5 || April 13 || Tigers || 4 – 2 || Morris (1-1) || Murray (0-1) || || 10,087 || 2-3
|-  style="text-align:center; background:#bfb;"
| 6 || April 14 || Tigers || 5 – 4 || Jackson (2-0) || Saucier (0-1) || || 10,114 || 3-3
|-  style="text-align:center; background:#fbb;"
| 7 || April 15 || @ Tigers || 4 – 2 || Saucier (1-1) || Stieb (0-1) || Sosa (1) || 51,038 || 3-4
|-  style="text-align:center; background:#bfb;"
| 8 || April 16 || @ Red Sox || 2 – 0 || Leal (2-0) || Eckersley (1-1) || Jackson (1) || 7,542 || 4-4
|-  style="text-align:center; background:#fbb;"
| 9 || April 17 || @ Red Sox || 5 – 4 || Tudor (2-0) || Bomback (0-2) || Clear (1) || 18,617 || 4-5
|-  style="text-align:center; background:#fbb;"
| 10 || April 18 || @ Red Sox || 4 – 3 || Aponte (1-0) || Jackson (2-1) || || 18,017 || 4-6
|-  style="text-align:center; background:#bfb;"
| 11 || April 19 || @ Red Sox || 5 – 4 || Murray (1-1) || Clear (0-1) || || 27,265 || 5-6
|-  style="text-align:center; background:#bbb;"
| -- || April 20 || @ Brewers || colspan=6|Postponed (cold weather) Rescheduled for August 12
|-  style="text-align:center; background:#fbb;"
| 12 || April 21 || @ Brewers || 3 – 1 || Lerch (1-0) || Leal (2-1) || Fingers (1) || 5,298 || 5-7
|-  style="text-align:center; background:#fbb;"
| 13 || April 22 || @ Brewers || 7 – 0 || Caldwell (1-1) || Bomback (0-3) || || 6,199 || 5-8
|-  style="text-align:center; background:#fbb;"
| 14 || April 23 || Red Sox || 5 – 4 || Tudor (3-0) || Clancy (0-2) || Clear (3) || 10,428 || 5-9
|-  style="text-align:center; background:#fbb;"
| 15 || April 24 || Red Sox || 8 – 7 || Torrez (1-1) || Stieb (0-2) || Aponte (2) || 13,135 || 5-10
|-  style="text-align:center; background:#fbb;"
| 16 || April 25 || Red Sox || 5 – 4 (12) || Clear (1-1) || McLaughlin (0-1) || || 21,043 || 5-11
|-  style="text-align:center; background:#bfb;"
| 17 || April 27 || Rangers || 8 – 4 || Murray (2-1) || Medich (1-2) || || 10,101 || 6-11
|-  style="text-align:center; background:#bfb;"
| 18 || April 28 || Rangers || 6 – 4 || Clancy (1-2) || Tanana (1-3) || McLaughlin (1) || 10,109 || 7-11
|-  style="text-align:center; background:#bfb;"
| 19 || April 29 || @ Royals || 7 – 0 || Stieb (1-2) || Splittorff (1-1) || || 15,707 || 8-11
|-  style="text-align:center; background:#fbb;"
| 20 || April 30 || @ Royals || 8 – 7 || Jackson (2-0) || Jackson (2-2) || Quisenberry (6) || 19,030 || 8-12
|-

|-  style="text-align:center; background:#fbb;"
| 21 || May 1 || @ Royals || 8 – 7 || Jackson (3-0) || Bomback (0-4) || Quisenberry (7) || 23,561 || 8-13
|-  style="text-align:center; background:#bfb;"
| 22 || May 2 || @ Royals || 7 – 5 || Clancy (2-2) || Leonard (2-2) || Jackson (2) || 27,044 || 9-13
|-  style="text-align:center; background:#fbb;"
| 23 || May 4 || @ White Sox || 4 – 3 || Burns (3-1) || Stieb (1-3) || Barojas (7) || 9,543 || 9-14
|-  style="text-align:center; background:#fbb;"
| 24 || May 5 || @ White Sox || 4 – 1 || Trout (2-2) || Leal (2-2) || Lamp (1) || 20,673 || 9-15
|-  style="text-align:center; background:#bfb;"
| 25 || May 7 || Royals || 6 – 4 || McLaughlin (1-1) || Leonard (2-3) || || 11,523 || 10-15
|-  style="text-align:center; background:#bfb;"
| 26 || May 8 || Royals || 2 – 1 || Bomback (1-4) || Frost (3-2) || Jackson (3) || 15,102 || 11-15
|-  style="text-align:center; background:#bfb;"
| 27 || May 9 || Royals || 2 – 0 || Stieb (2-3) || Splittorff (2-2) || || 17,044 || 12-15
|-  style="text-align:center; background:#fbb;"
| 28 || May 10 || White Sox || 6 – 3 || Burns (4-1) || McLaughlin (1-2) || Hickey (1) || 11,520 || 12-16
|-  style="text-align:center; background:#bfb;"
| 29 || May 11 || White Sox || 9 – 4 || Clancy (3-2) || Trout (2-3) || || 10,700 || 13-16
|-  style="text-align:center; background:#fbb;"
| 30 || May 12 || White Sox || 9 – 2 || Lamp (3-0) || Bomback (1-5) || || 11,473 || 13-17
|-  style="text-align:center; background:#fbb;"
| 31 || May 13 || @ Rangers || 4 – 3 || Darwin (3-1) || Stieb (2-4) || || 6,819 || 13-18
|-  style="text-align:center; background:#fbb;"
| 32 || May 14 || @ Rangers || 4 – 3 (11)|| Mirabella (1-0) || Jackson (2-3) || || 10,972 || 13-19
|-  style="text-align:center; background:#bfb;"
| 33 || May 15 || @ Rangers || 5 – 2 || Clancy (4-2) || Tanana (1-5) || || 14,405 || 14-19
|-  style="text-align:center; background:#fbb;"
| 34 || May 16 || @ Rangers || 2 – 1 (10)|| Darwin (4-1) || Jackson (2-4) || || 29,303 || 14-20
|-  style="text-align:center; background:#fbb;"
| 35 || May 18 || @ Indians || 6 – 5 || Spillner (1-3) || Murray (2-2) || || 5,865 || 14-21
|-  style="text-align:center; background:#bfb;"
| 36 || May 19 || @ Indians || 8 – 5 || Garvin (1-0) || Barker (4-2) || McLaughlin (2) || 5,724 || 15-21
|-  style="text-align:center; background:#bfb;"
| 37 || May 20 || @ Indians || 2 – 0 || Clancy (5-2) || Sorensen (3-3) || || 6,226 || 16-21
|-  style="text-align:center; background:#fbb;"
| 38 || May 21 || Orioles || 3 – 0 || Flanagan (2-4) || Gott (0-1) || Martinez (3) || 12,387 || 16-22
|-  style="text-align:center; background:#fbb;"
| 39 || May 22 || Orioles || 6 – 0 || Martínez (4-3) || Stieb (2-5) || || 17,457 || 16-23
|-  style="text-align:center; background:#bfb;"
| 40 || May 23 || Orioles || 7 – 1 || Leal (3-2) || Stewart (4-3) || || 14,229 || 17-23
|-  style="text-align:center; background:#fbb;"
| 41 || May 24 || Orioles || 7 – 5 || McGregor (6-3) || Clancy (5-3) || Stoddard (3) || 12,088 || 17-24
|-  style="text-align:center; background:#fbb;"
| 42 || May 25 || @ Yankees || 8 – 0 || John (4-4) || Gott (0-2) || || 20,127 || 17-25
|-  style="text-align:center; background:#bfb;"
| 43 || May 26 || @ Yankees || 7 – 0 || Stieb (3-5) || May (1-3) || || 15,090 || 18-25
|-  style="text-align:center; background:#bbb;"
| -- || May 28 || @ Orioles || colspan=6|Postponed (rain) Rescheduled for May 29
|-  style="text-align:center; background:#fbb;"
| 44 || May 29 || @ Orioles || 3 – 1 || Flanagan (3-4) || Leal (3-3) || || || 18-26
|-  style="text-align:center; background:#bfb;"
| 45 || May 29 || @ Orioles || 11 – 10 || McLaughlin (2-2) || Stoddard (0-2) || || 21,241 || 19-26
|-  style="text-align:center; background:#bfb;"
| 46 || May 30 || @ Orioles || 6 – 0 || Gott (1-2) || Palmer (2-3) || Jackson (4) || 21,632 || 20-26
|-  style="text-align:center; background:#bfb;"
| 47 || May 31 || Yankees || 5 – 4 || Stieb (4-5) || Erickson (4-5) || || 20,136 || 21-26
|-

|-  style="text-align:center; background:#bfb;"
| 48 || June 1 || Yankees || 5 – 2 || Murray (3-2) || Rawley (3-2) || || 17,460 || 22-26
|-  style="text-align:center; background:#fbb;"
| 49 || June 2 || Yankees || 12 – 6 (13)|| Rawley (4-2) || McLaughlin (2-3) || || 20,161 || 22-27
|-  style="text-align:center; background:#bfb;"
| 50 || June 3 || Yankees || 3 – 1 || Leal (4-3) || John (4-5) || || 20,147 || 23-27
|-  style="text-align:center; background:#fbb;"
| 51 || June 4 || Indians || 6 – 3 || Barker (7-2) || Murray (3-3) || Spillner (6) || 12,371 || 23-28
|-  style="text-align:center; background:#bbb;"
| -- || June 5 || Indians || colspan=6|Postponed (rain) Rescheduled for August 17
|-  style="text-align:center; background:#bfb;"
| 52 || June 6 || Indians || 5 – 1 || Stieb (5-5) || Sorensen (5-4) || || || 24-28
|-  style="text-align:center; background:#fbb;"
| 53 || June 6 || Indians || 7 – 5 || Glynn (2-0) || Garvin (1-1) || Spillner (7) || 17,131 || 24-29
|-  style="text-align:center; background:#bfb;"
| 54 || June 7 || Indians || 7 – 3 || Leal (5-3) || Denny (3-6) || || 11,150 || 25-29
|-  style="text-align:center; background:#fbb;"
| 55 || June 8 || Angels || 11 – 4 || Zahn (6-2) || Gott (1-3) || || 16,154 || 25-30
|-  style="text-align:center; background:#bfb;"
| 56 || June 9 || Angels || 5 – 4 || McLaughlin (3-3) || Corbett (1-6) || || 16,193 || 26-30
|-  style="text-align:center; background:#bfb;"
| 57 || June 11 || Athletics || 2 – 1 || Clancy (6-3) || Kingman (0-1) || || 17,461 || 27-30
|-  style="text-align:center; background:#fbb;"
| 58 || June 12 || Athletics || 8 – 1 || Langford (5-7) || Stieb (5-6) || || 24,338 || 27-31
|-  style="text-align:center; background:#fbb;"
| 59 || June 13 || Athletics || 7 – 5 || Underwood (3-4) || Jackson (2-5) || Beard (4) || 20,113 || 27-32
|-  style="text-align:center; background:#fbb;"
| 60 || June 14 || Athletics || 4 – 2 || Keough (6-7) || Gott (1-4) || Beard (5) || 14,136 || 27-33
|-  style="text-align:center; background:#bfb;"
| 61 || June 15 || @ Angels || 2 – 0 || Clancy (7-3) || Witt (3-1) || || 23,217 || 28-33
|-  style="text-align:center; background:#fbb;"
| 62 || June 16 || @ Angels || 7 – 1 || Renko (6-1) || Stieb (5-7) || || 20,970 || 28-34
|-  style="text-align:center; background:#fbb;"
| 63 || June 17 || @ Angels || 10 – 8 || Kison (6-2) || Leal (5-4) || Moreno (1) || 21,195 || 28-35
|-  style="text-align:center; background:#bfb;"
| 64 || June 18 || @ Athletics || 6 – 4 || McLaughlin (4-3) || Keough (6-8) || || 12,061 || 29-35
|-  style="text-align:center; background:#bfb;"
| 65 || June 19 || @ Athletics || 3 – 1 (12)|| McLaughlin (5-3) || Owchinko (1-1) || || 19,214 || 30-35
|-  style="text-align:center; background:#bfb;"
| 66 || June 20 || @ Athletics || 3 – 2 || Stieb (6-7) || Langford (5-8) || || 26,096 || 31-35
|-  style="text-align:center; background:#fbb;"
| 67 || June 21 || @ Mariners || 5 – 4 || Moore (3-6) || Leal (5-5) || Caudill (10) || 7,486 || 31-36
|-  style="text-align:center; background:#fbb;"
| 68 || June 22 || @ Mariners || 6 – 5 || Clark (1-0) || Jackson (2-6) || Caudill (11) || 7,933 || 31-37
|-  style="text-align:center; background:#bfb;"
| 69 || June 23 || @ Mariners || 5 – 3 (11)|| McLaughlin (6-3) || Stanton (1-1) || || 9,007 || 32-37
|-  style="text-align:center; background:#bbb;"
| -- || June 25 || Twins || colspan=6|Postponed (rain) Rescheduled for September 28
|-  style="text-align:center; background:#fbb;"
| 70 || June 26 || Twins || 4 – 3 || Davis (2-7) || Stieb (6-8) || || 14,052 || 32-38
|-  style="text-align:center; background:#bfb;"
| 71 || June 27 || Twins || 3 – 2 || McLaughlin (7-3) || Felton (0-8) || || 20,074 || 33-38
|-  style="text-align:center; background:#fbb;"
| 72 || June 29 || Mariners || 4 – 1 || Bannister (7-4) || Clancy (7-4) || Stanton (5) || 13,097 || 33-39
|-  style="text-align:center; background:#fbb;"
| 73 || June 30 || Mariners || 10 – 4 || Beattie (6-4) || Stieb (6-9) || || 12,339 || 33-40
|-

|-  style="text-align:center; background:#fbb;"
| 74 || July 1 || Mariners || 4 – 3 || Perry (6-7) || Leal (5-6) || Caudill (14) || 21,004 || 33-41
|-  style="text-align:center; background:#bfb;"
| 75 || July 2 || @ Twins || 9 – 4 || Murray (4-3) || Havens (3-6) || McLaughlin (3) || 7,503 || 34-41
|-  style="text-align:center; background:#fbb;"
| 76 || July 3 || @ Twins || 2 – 1 || O'Connor (1-2) || Clancy (7-5) || || 9,591 || 34-42
|-  style="text-align:center; background:#fbb;"
| 77 || July 4 || @ Twins || 4 – 3 || Little (1-0) || Stieb (6-10) || || 6,532 || 34-43
|-  style="text-align:center; background:#fbb;"
| 78 || July 5 || @ Rangers || 3 – 2 || Matlack (4-5) || Leal (5-7) || Darwin (4) || 29,126 || 34-44
|-  style="text-align:center; background:#bfb;"
| 79 || July 6 || @ Rangers || 4 – 3 || Murray (5-3) || Tanana (4-10) || || 9,657 || 35-44
|-  style="text-align:center; background:#fbb;"
| 80 || July 7 || @ Royals || 3 – 1 || Gura (10-4) || Clancy (7-6) || || 22,217 || 35-45
|-  style="text-align:center; background:#bfb;"
| 81 || July 8 || @ Royals || 5 – 4 || Stieb (7-10) || Armstrong (2-3) || McLaughlin (4) || 24,409 || 36-45
|-  style="text-align:center; background:#bfb;"
| 82 || July 9 || White Sox || 7 – 6 || Murray (6-3) || Dotson (3-10) || McLaughlin (5) || 15,131 || 37-45
|-  style="text-align:center; background:#fbb;"
| 83 || July 10 || White Sox || 6 – 5 || Escárrega (1-1) || Gott (1-5) || Hickey (4) || 17,035 || 37-46
|-  style="text-align:center; background:#fbb;"
| 84 || July 11 || White Sox || 16 – 7 || Burns (9-4) || Clancy (7-7) || || 16,169 || 37-47
|-  style="text-align:center; background:#bfb;"
| 85 || July 15 || Rangers || 5 – 1 || Stieb (8-10) || Honeycutt (4-10) || || 14,123 || 38-47
|-  style="text-align:center; background:#bfb;"
| 86 || July 16 || Rangers || 6 – 0 || Clancy (8-7) || Hough (7-8) || || 13,359 || 39-47
|-  style="text-align:center; background:#bfb;"
| 87 || July 17 || Rangers || 11 – 3 || Jackson (3-6) || Butcher (0-1) || || 17,080 || 40-47
|-  style="text-align:center; background:#bfb;"
| 88 || July 18 || Rangers || 5 – 4 (10)|| McLaughlin (8-3) || Darwin (6-4) || || 15,512 || 41-47
|-  style="text-align:center; background:#bfb;"
| 89 || July 19 || Royals || 4 – 2 || Leal (6-7) || Black (3-3) || || 16,466 || 42-47
|-  style="text-align:center; background:#bfb;"
| 90 || July 20 || Royals || 9 – 2 || Stieb (9-10) || Gura (10-7) || || 18,552 || 43-47
|-  style="text-align:center; background:#fbb;"
| 91 || July 21 || Royals || 9 – 7 || Blue (7-7) || Clancy (8-8) || Quisenberry (23) || 19,152 || 43-48
|-  style="text-align:center; background:#fbb;"
| 92 || July 22 || @ White Sox || 3 – 2 || Burns (10-4) || McLaughlin (8-4) || || 21,875 || 43-49
|-  style="text-align:center; background:#bfb;"
| 93 || July 23 || @ White Sox || 7 – 1 || Leal (7-7) || Barnes (0-2) || Jackson (5) || 27,770 || 44-49
|-  style="text-align:center; background:#bfb;"
| 94 || July 24 || @ White Sox || 8 – 1 || Stieb (10-10) || Lamp (7-5) || Murray (1) || 21,821 || 45-49
|-  style="text-align:center; background:#fbb;"
| 95 || July 25 || @ White Sox || 5 – 3 || Hoyt (12-9) || Clancy (8-9) || || 17,452 || 45-50
|-  style="text-align:center; background:#fbb;"
| 96 || July 26 || @ Red Sox || 3 – 2 || Eckersley (11-8) || Gott (1-6) || || 22,261 || 45-51
|-  style="text-align:center; background:#bfb;"
| 97 || July 27 || @ Red Sox || 3 – 1 || Leal (8-7) || Tudor (6-8) || || 27,077 || 46-51
|-  style="text-align:center; background:#fbb;"
| 98 || July 28 || @ Red Sox || 9 – 7 || Ojeda (4-5) || Jackson (3-7) || Stanley (8) || 18,627 || 46-52
|-  style="text-align:center; background:#bfb;"
| 99 || July 30 || Tigers || 6 – 5 (12)|| Murray (7-3) || James (0-2) || || 18,262 || 47-52
|-  style="text-align:center; background:#bfb;"
| 100 || July 31 || Tigers || 1 – 0 (10)|| Gott (2-6) || Rucker (1-1) || || 21,007 || 48-52
|-

|-  style="text-align:center; background:#fbb;"
| 101 || August 1 || Tigers || 8 – 5 || Morris (12-11) || Leal (8-8) || Tobik (5) || 23,033 || 48-53
|-  style="text-align:center; background:#bfb;"
| 102 || August 2 || Brewers || 9 – 4 || Stieb (11-10) || McClure (8-4) || || 20,141 || 49-53
|-  style="text-align:center; background:#fbb;"
| 103 || August 3 || Brewers || 7 – 4 || Vuckovich (12-4) || Clancy (8-10) || Fingers (24) || 16,575 || 49-54
|-  style="text-align:center; background:#fbb;"
| 104 || August 4 || Brewers || 8 – 0 || Caldwell (9-10) || Gott (2-7) || || 17,521 || 49-55
|-  style="text-align:center; background:#fbb;"
| 105 || August 5 || @ Tigers || 5 – 2 || Ujdur (5-5) || Leal (8-9) || || || 49-56
|-  style="text-align:center; background:#fbb;"
| 106 || August 5 || @ Tigers || 7 – 4 || Rucker (2-1) || Jackson (3-8) || Tobik (6) || 26,010 || 49-57
|-  style="text-align:center; background:#fbb;"
| 107 || August 6 || @ Tigers || 6 – 0 || Morris (13-11) || Stieb (11-11) || || 21,602 || 49-58
|-  style="text-align:center; background:#bfb;"
| 108 || August 7 || @ Tigers || 7 – 4 || Clancy (9-10) || Pashnick (3-4) || Murray (2) || 20,608 || 50-58
|-  style="text-align:center; background:#bfb;"
| 109 || August 8 || @ Tigers || 7 – 4 || Gott (3-7) || Underwood (3-8) || McLaughlin (6) || || 51-58
|-  style="text-align:center; background:#bfb;"
| 110 || August 8 || @ Tigers || 7 – 4 || Geisel (1-0) || Rucker (2-2) || Murray (3) || 23,550 || 52-58
|-  style="text-align:center; background:#bfb;"
| 111 || August 9 || Red Sox || 4 – 2 || Schrom (1-0) || Eckersley (11-10) || McLaughlin (7) || 20,105 || 53-58
|-  style="text-align:center; background:#bfb;"
| 112 || August 10 || Red Sox || 4 – 0 || Stieb (12-11) || Torrez (7-7) || || 21,324 || 54-58
|-  style="text-align:center; background:#bfb;"
| 113 || August 11 || Red Sox || 4 – 3 || Jackson (4-8) || Stanley (7-5) || || 22,012 || 55-58
|-  style="text-align:center; background:#fbb;"
| 114 || August 12 || @ Brewers || 7 – 1 || McClure (9-4) || Gott (3-8) || || || 55-59
|-  style="text-align:center; background:#fbb;"
| 115 || August 12 || @ Brewers || 4 – 3 || Lerch (8-7) || Murray (7-4) || Fingers (27) || 28,305 || 55-60
|-  style="text-align:center; background:#fbb;"
| 116 || August 13 || @ Brewers || 3 – 1 || Vuckovich (13-4) || Leal (8-10) || || 49,064 || 55-61
|-  style="text-align:center; background:#bfb;"
| 117 || August 14 || @ Brewers || 4 – 2 || Stieb (13-11) || Caldwell (10-11) || || 28,940 || 56-61
|-  style="text-align:center; background:#bfb;"
| 118 || August 15 || @ Brewers || 3 – 2 || Clancy (10-10) || Slaton (9-4) || Murray (4) || 26,180 || 57-61
|-  style="text-align:center; background:#bfb;"
| 119 || August 16 || Indians || 2 – 1 || Gott (4-8) || Waits (1-12) || McLaughlin (8) || 17,704 || 58-61
|-  style="text-align:center; background:#fbb;"
| 120 || August 17 || Indians || 6 – 5 || Spillner (9-7) || McLaughlin (8-5) || || || 58-62
|-  style="text-align:center; background:#fbb;"
| 121 || August 17 || Indians || 9 – 5 || Sutcliffe (10-4) || Geisel (1-1) || || 26,636 || 58-63
|-  style="text-align:center; background:#fbb;"
| 122 || August 20 || @ Yankees || 4 – 2 || Rawley (7-8) || Stieb (13-12) || Gossage (26) || 20,172 || 58-64
|-  style="text-align:center; background:#bfb;"
| 123 || August 21 || @ Yankees || 3 – 1 || Clancy (11-10) || Guidry (11-5) || Murray (5) || 24,029 || 59-64
|-  style="text-align:center; background:#fbb;"
| 124 || August 22 || @ Yankees || 3 – 1 || Righetti (8-5) || Gott (4-9) || Gossage (27) || 33,692 || 59-65
|-  style="text-align:center; background:#fbb;"
| 125 || August 23 || @ Yankees || 4 – 3 || LaRoche (4-1) || Leal (8-11) || Gossage (28) || 16,565 || 59-66
|-  style="text-align:center; background:#fbb;"
| 126 || August 24 || @ Orioles || 7 – 3 (10)|| Martínez (12-10) || McLaughlin (8-6) || || 12,139 || 59-67
|-  style="text-align:center; background:#fbb;"
| 127 || August 25 || @ Orioles || 8 – 3 || Flanagan (10-10) || Clancy (11-11) || || 11,712 || 59-68
|-  style="text-align:center; background:#fbb;"
| 128 || August 26 || @ Orioles || 12 – 5 || Davis (4-3) || Gott (4-10) || || 21,471 || 59-69
|-  style="text-align:center; background:#bfb;"
| 129 || August 27 || Yankees || 10 – 3 || Leal (9-11) || Righetti (8-6) || || 28,438 || 60-69
|-  style="text-align:center; background:#bfb;"
| 130 || August 28 || Yankees || 3 – 2 (11)|| Murray (8-4) || LaRoche (4-2) || || 35,065 || 61-69
|-  style="text-align:center; background:#fbb;"
| 131 || August 29 || Yankees || 8 – 2 || John (10-10) || Clancy (11-12) || || 34,313 || 61-70
|-  style="text-align:center; background:#fbb;"
| 132 || August 30 || Orioles || 6 – 3 || Davis (5-3) || Eichhorn (0-1) || Martinez (12) || 14,091 || 61-71
|-  style="text-align:center; background:#fbb;"
| 133 || August 31 || Orioles || 1 – 0 || Palmer (12-3) || Leal (9-12) || || 14,690 || 61-72
|-

|-  style="text-align:center; background:#fbb;"
| 134 || September 1 || Orioles || 5 – 2 || Martínez (14-10) || Stieb (13-13) || || 12,473 || 61-73
|-  style="text-align:center; background:#fbb;"
| 135 || September 3 || @ Indians || 3 – 2 || Anderson (2-2) || Clancy (11-13) || Brennan (2) || 12,131 || 61-74
|-  style="text-align:center; background:#fbb;"
| 136 || September 4 || @ Indians || 4 – 3 || Brennan (1-2) || Murray (8-5) || Spillner (17) || 6,110 || 61-75
|-  style="text-align:center; background:#bfb;"
| 137 || September 5 || @ Indians || 6 – 5 || Leal (10-12) || Barker (12-11) || Murray (6) || 6,968 || 62-75
|-  style="text-align:center; background:#bfb;"
| 138 || September 6 || @ Athletics || 3 – 1 || Stieb (14-13) || Kingman (3-11) || || 20,172 || 63-75
|-  style="text-align:center; background:#bfb;"
| 139 || September 7 || @ Athletics || 2 – 1 || Clancy (12-13) || D'Acquisto (0-1) || Murray (7) || 8,403 || 64-75
|-  style="text-align:center; background:#bfb;"
| 140 || September 8 || @ Athletics || 6 – 5 || Jackson (5-8) || Conroy (0-1) || Murray (8) || 10,786 || 65-75
|-  style="text-align:center; background:#fbb;"
| 141 || September 10 || @ Angels || 6 – 2 || Zahn (16-7) || Leal (10-13) || || 25,012 || 65-76
|-  style="text-align:center; background:#fbb;"
| 142 || September 11 || @ Angels || 4 – 1 || Forsch (12-10) || Stieb (14-14) || || 43,819 || 65-77
|-  style="text-align:center; background:#fbb;"
| 143 || September 12 || @ Angels || 3 – 2 || John (12-11) || Clancy (12-14) || Curtis (1) || 25,394 || 65-78
|-  style="text-align:center; background:#bbb;"
| -- || September 14 || Athletics || colspan=6|Postponed (rain) Rescheduled for September 15
|-  style="text-align:center; background:#bfb;"
| 144 || September 15 || Athletics || 3 – 2 || Leal (11-13) || Conroy (0-2) || Murray (9) || || 66-78
|-  style="text-align:center; background:#bfb;"
| 145 || September 15 || Athletics || 12 – 11 || Jackson (6-8) || Hanna (0-3) || || 12,090 || 67-78
|-  style="text-align:center; background:#bfb;"
| 146 || September 16 || Angels || 2 – 1 (12)|| Jackson (7-8) || Sánchez (6-3) || || 15,693 || 68-78
|-  style="text-align:center; background:#bfb;"
| 147 || September 17 || Angels || 6 – 2 || Clancy (13-14) || John (12-12) || Murray (10) || 15,605 || 69-78
|-  style="text-align:center; background:#fbb;"
| 148 || September 18 || Angels || 8 – 6 || Sánchez (7-3) || Murray (8-6) || || 20,533 || 69-79
|-  style="text-align:center; background:#fbb;"
| 149 || September 19 || Angels || 5 – 1 || Kison (9-5) || Eichhorn (0-2) || || 22,025 || 69-80
|-  style="text-align:center; background:#fbb;"
| 150 || September 20 || @ Twins || 4 – 1 || Castillo (11-11) || Leal (11-14) || Davis (21) || 2,830 || 69-81
|-  style="text-align:center; background:#bfb;"
| 151 || September 21 || @ Twins || 5 – 1 || Stieb (15-14) || Viola (4-8) || || 3,282 || 70-81
|-  style="text-align:center; background:#bfb;"
| 152 || September 22 || @ Twins || 3 – 2 (10)|| Clancy (14-14) || Havens (9-13) || || 3,676 || 71-81
|-  style="text-align:center; background:#fbb;"
| 153 || September 24 || @ Mariners || 3 – 2 || Vande Berg (9-4) || Murray (8-7) || || 14,071 || 71-82
|-  style="text-align:center; background:#fbb;"
| 154 || September 25 || @ Mariners || 7 – 0 || Clark (5-2) || Leal (11-15) || || 18,818 || 71-83
|-  style="text-align:center; background:#bfb;"
| 155 || September 26 || @ Mariners || 6 – 2 || Stieb (16-14) || Bannister (12-12) || || 6,742 || 72-83
|-  style="text-align:center; background:#bfb;"
| 156 || September 28 || Twins || 3 – 0 || Clancy (15-14) || Viola (4-9) || || || 73-83
|-  style="text-align:center; background:#bfb;"
| 157 || September 28 || Twins || 4 – 3 (10)|| Jackson (8-8) || Davis (3-9) || || 11,124 || 74-83
|-  style="text-align:center; background:#fbb;"
| 158 || September 29 || Twins || 8 – 0 || Havens (10-13) || Eichhorn (0-3) || || 10,364 || 74-84
|-  style="text-align:center; background:#bfb;"
| 159 || September 30 || Twins || 6 – 4 || Leal (12-15) || O'Connor (8-9) || Murray (11) || 11,076 || 75-84
|-

|-  style="text-align:center; background:#bfb;"
| 160 || October 1 || Mariners || 2 – 0 || Stieb (17-14) || Bannister (12-13) || || 11,171 || 76-84
|-  style="text-align:center; background:#bfb;"
| 161 || October 2 || Mariners || 3 – 0 || Gott (5-10) || Stoddard (3-3) || Jackson (6) || 12,472 || 77-84
|-  style="text-align:center; background:#bfb;"
| 162 || October 3 || Mariners || 5 – 2 || Clancy (16-14) || Caudill (12-9) || || 19,064 || 78-84
|-

Player stats

Batting

Starters by position
Note: Pos = Position; G = Games played; AB = At bats; R = Runs scored; H = Hits; 2B = Doubles; 3B = Triples; HR = Home runs; RBI = Runs batted in; AVG = Batting average; SB = Stolen bases

Other batters
Note: G = Games played; AB = At bats; R = Runs scored; H = Hits; 2B = Doubles; 3B = Triples; HR = Home runs; RBI = Runs batted in; AVG = Batting average; SB = Stolen bases

Pitching
Note: W = Wins; L = Losses; ERA = Earned run average; G = Games pitched; GS = Games started; SV = Saves; IP = Innings pitched; R = Runs allowed; ER = Earned runs allowed; BB = Walks allowed; K = Strikeouts

Award winners
Jim Clancy, American League All-Star Selection, Reserve
Dámaso García, 2B, Silver Slugger Award
Dave Stieb, The Sporting News Pitcher of the Year Award
 Dave Stieb, American League Leader, 19 Complete Games
 Dave Stieb, American League Leader, 5 Shutouts

Farm system

LEAGUE CHAMPIONS: Medicine Hat

Notes

External links
1982 Toronto Blue Jays at Baseball Reference
1982 Toronto Blue Jays at Baseball Almanac

Toronto Blue Jays seasons
Toronto Blue Jays season
1982 in Canadian sports
1982 in Toronto